José Javier "Chucho" Acasuso (born 20 October 1982) is a former professional male tennis player from Argentina. Like many of his fellow countrymen, he favoured clay. He was known for his strong serve and his hard groundstrokes off both sides. His clothes sponsor was Topper and his racquet sponsor Head.

Career
Acasuso began playing tennis at the age of two, when his father took his brother and sister to his grandfather's tennis club. Reportedly, he got the nickname of "Chucho" from the fact that, when he was a child, he used to say his name was "José Acachucho." Acasuso played both basketball and tennis up until the age of 12, and then gave up basketball for tennis. Like Carlos Moyà, Acasuso is a natural left-hander, but plays tennis right-handed.

Acasuso turned professional in 2000, playing futures and challenger events. In 2001, he made an immediate impact in his first ATP tournament in Buenos Aires, where he defeated former No. 10 player Félix Mantilla in the last round of the qualifying to make the main draw, and then defeated compatriots Franco Squillari in the quarter-finals and Gastón Gaudio in the semi-finals. However, he lost in the final to then-number-1 player Gustavo Kuerten 6–1, 6–3. Later in the year, he won his first challenger event in Bermuda and finished the year ranked at 86 in the world an improvement of 89 places from the previous year.

In 2002, he was on the Argentine team that won the World Team Cup in Düsseldorf. He won his first ATP title in Sopot, defeating Franco Squillari in three sets. He was also a finalist in Bucharest, losing to David Ferrer, and in Palermo to the Chilean Fernando González. He ended the year ranked 41st in the world.

After the previous two successful years, Acasuso's results began to decline and he ended up spending more time out due to injuries. He did not win a title in 2003. In 2004, however, he reached the final of Sopot again, this time losing to Rafael Nadal. Acasuso then went on to win his second career title in Bucharest by beating Russian Igor Andreev in two sets.

Acasuso reached the fourth round of the 2005 French Open, his best ever result in any of the Grand Slam events. He defeated number-2-seeded Andy Roddick in five sets, coming back from 2 sets to love down and a break of serve to win. He then lost to fellow Argentine Mariano Puerta for the second time in the year. He also improved his results away from his favoured clay surface by making the quarter finals on hard courts in Cincinnati and on carpet in Basel.

In 2006, Acasuso won his third ATP title in Viña del Mar over Nicolás Massú and also made his debut for Argentina in the Davis Cup against Sweden in the singles. He then played against Croatia in the doubles with David Nalbandian. They won their match and the tie to play against Australia in the semi-finals.

After reaching his first Tennis Masters Series semi-final in Hamburg, where Acasuso defeated Simon Greul, Ivan Ljubičić, Sébastien Grosjean, and Fernando Verdasco, before losing to Radek Štěpánek in straight sets, he was ranked inside the top 30 for the first time in his career. Acasuso lost in the final of Stuttgart to David Ferrer in five sets, after having a 5–1 lead in the fourth set and served for the match twice.

In the 2006 Davis Cup tie between Argentina and Australia, Acasuso ended the run of 11 consecutive wins that Lleyton Hewitt was on of winning in 5 set matches, when he defeated him in a five-set match that was completed over two days. Of the win Acasuso said "I've beaten higher-ranked players in the past but to win at home in a Davis Cup semi-final with 14,000 people watching me here makes it one of the most important wins of my career". Acasuso was a late substitute for Juan Ignacio Chela in the deciding fifth rubber of the 2006 Davis Cup Final against Marat Safin of Russia. Safin won in four sets to win the Davis Cup for Russia.

Acasuso, together with Sebastián Prieto, has won three doubles titles: in 2005 in Stuttgart and Bucharest, and in 2006 in Viña del Mar. Prior to that Acasuso won a doubles title partnering Flávio Saretta at Umag in 2004.

He was previously coached by Horacio de la Peña, Daniel Orsanic and later worked with Gabriel Markus.

In the 2008 Davis Cup final, Acasuso was once again a late substitute in what turned out to be the tie-deciding fourth rubber. He replaced an injured Juan Martín del Potro and was defeated by Fernando Verdasco of Spain in a five-set match.

Acasuso made the final of the 2009 Viña del Mar event, where he lost to Fernando González 6–1, 6–3. His most notable match in 2009 was his second round match at French Open 2009 against the eventual champion Roger Federer in which he lost in four sets. In this match he missed four set points in the first set and three set points in the third set while leading that set by 5–1

On 24 February 2012, Acasuso officially announced his retirement from professional tennis.

ATP career finals

Singles: 11 (3 titles, 8 runner-ups)

Doubles: 11 (5 titles, 6 runner-ups)

ATP Challenger and ITF Futures Finals

Singles: 13 (6–7)

Doubles: 5 (1–4)

Team competition finals: 2 (2 runner-up)

Performance timelines

Singles

Doubles

References

External links
 
 
 

1982 births
Living people
Argentine sportspeople of Italian descent
Argentine male tennis players
People from Posadas, Misiones
Sportspeople from Misiones Province